Rabemananjara is a Malagasy surname. Notable people with the surname include:

Charles Rabemananjara (born 1947), former Prime Minister of Madagascar
Jacques Rabemananjara (1913–2005), Malagasy politician
Praxis Rabemananjara (born 1987), Malagasy football striker

Malagasy-language surnames